Trictenotoma templetoni, is a species of croc beetle found in Sri Lanka.

Description
Mandibles of the male outwardly much sinuated which aimed near the apex with a large upright tooth. Antenna, legs, and two elevated spots on the pronotum are shining black. Sides of the body is angulated and the scutellum is triangular.

References 

Trictenotomidae
Insects of Sri Lanka
Beetles described in 1848